A desert is a geographic area that receives little precipitation.

Desert may also refer to:

Places
 Desert, County Tyrone, a townland in County Tyrone, Northern Ireland, United Kingdom
 Desert, Texas, an unincorporated community in Collin County, Texas, United States

Places bereft of some resource
 Banking desert
 Book desert
 Desert (particle physics), a theorized gap in energy scales, in which no new physics appears
 Food desert

Arts, entertainment, and media

Music
 Desert (English band), an English electronic and house music duo
 "Desert" (Émilie Simon song), a 2002 song from her 2002 album, Émilie Simon.
 "Desert" (Paces song), a 2016 song by Australian musician Paces featuring Guy Sebastian from their 2016 album, Vacation.
 "Desert", by D'espairsRay from Mirror
 Déserts, a musical composition by Edgard Varese
 Le désert, an ode-symphonie by Félicien David
 "The Desert", by Pseudo Echo from Ultraviolet

Other arts, entertainment, and media
 "The Desert" (Avatar: The Last Airbender), an episode of Avatar: The Last Airbender
 The Desert (Dragon Prince), a fictional Princedom (or country) in Melanie Rawn's Dragon Prince and Dragon Star novel trilogies

Other uses
 Desert (philosophy), the condition of being deserving of something
 Desertion, the abandonment of a duty or post without permission

See also 

 Desert people(s) of Australia
 Deseret (disambiguation), a term in the Book of Mormon, meaning "honeybee"
 Désert (disambiguation)
 Dessert, a usually sweet course that concludes a meal